The Bothnia Line is a high-speed railway line in northern Sweden.

Introduction
Completed in August 2010, the Bothnia Line adds  of high-speed railway to the Swedish railway network. At up to  this is also the highest-speed track in the country. The route branches off from the Ådalen Line at Höga Kusten Airport just north of Kramfors and goes via Örnsköldsvik to Umeå where it connects to the Umeå-Vännäs line and the Main Line Through Upper Norrland.

Construction was carried out by Botniabanan AB, a company owned 91% by the Swedish government and 9% by the municipalities of Kramfors, Örnsköldsvik, Nordmaling and Umeå. Work began on the line in 1999, and reached the halfway point at the end of 2005. After its completion in 2010, the line was leased to the Swedish Rail Administration. When Botniabanan AB has recovered its investment (estimated to be 2050), the ownership of the line will pass to the Rail Administration. The construction budget was SEK 15 billion.

It is intended that the Bothnia Line will compete with road transport using the European route E4, which is a main road carrying heavy freight traffic; however because the line uses the European Rail Traffic Management System signal system, which most of Sweden does not, relatively few freight train operators have invested in the ERTMS technology for their locomotives.

Passenger traffic between Umeå and Örnsköldsvik began in August 2010. The delayed upgrade of the ERTMS signal system on the Ådalen Line meant that traffic south of Örnsköldsvik did not begin until 2012.

Purpose
A railway line along the coast of northern Sweden has been considered beneficial for many years, with a lack of capacity and long travel times on the existing main line (further inland) because of lower speed limits, curves, and gradients. The Bothnia line also improves public mobility in the area, reducing the travel time between Umeå and Örnsköldsvik to 50 minutes via high-speed train. It is also served by regional trains, at a frequency of up to two trains (mostly one train) in each direction an hour.

Railway standard
The line is single track (with grading and other provisions for a second track), and has 22 passing loops. The maximum grade is 1%.

Delayed stretch through the natural reservation area
The middle part of the railway was ready for traffic in 2008, and all of the railway except the northern part from October 2009. The northern part, near Umeå, did not see operation until August 2010, due to a court battle over the placement of a bridge that crosses over environmentally sensitive areas at the Ume River. These areas are protected as a nature reserve and the process to approve its location was opposed by environmentalists and neighbours concerned about their properties. Other alternatives to the present location were deemed unacceptably close to the Umeå Airport for safety reasons, and a tunnel under the airport and river would have been much too expensive. A more southerly route would have lengthened the line and been more expensive. The crux of this debate was that the nature reserve was established some years after the railway line placement had been fixed.

There was no passenger traffic before all of the railway was finished, because the largest city, Umeå, was not connected to this line before then, though some freight traffic used the finished sections.

Times, distances and average speed

The railway line itself allows .

The Transitio leasing company owned by the counties signed a contract in October 2008 to buy Alstom Coradia trains. So far the suppliers cannot guarantee winter characteristics above , since there is no experience operating at such speeds in the northern Swedish climate. Still 2021, no trains run here above  since operator hasn't bought faster trains considering it's the only railway in Sweden allowing it above , and the fact that air travel is much faster Stockholm-Umeå anyway.

Parts of the  railway started to be used by freight trains on 16 October 2008, but with manual train protection control.

No Alstom train was delivered for the traffic opening in August 2010, since the delivery time is at least two years. Traffic to and from Sundsvall started autumn 2012. SJ ran the Stockholm-Narvik and Göteborg-Luleå night trains over Långsele-Mellansel-Örnsköldsvik-Umeå from August 2010, and from 2012 the shorter way Sundsvall-Kramfors-Umeå.

Stations

The trains stop at:

On the Ådalen Line:
Sundsvall Central Station 319.391 km
Timrå             295.681 km
Härnösand         248.051 km
Kramfors          208.366 km
Västeraspby (transfer, upon request, to the Höga Kusten Airport; about 2 km road distance)
On the Bothnia Line:
Örnsköldsvik Central Station 115.402 km
Örnsköldsvik North   112.986 km
Husum   90.313 km
Nordmaling            58.109 km
Hörnefors             34.856 km
Umeå East Station      2.016 km
Umeå Central Station       0 km
Some trains stop at the larger stations only.

The most used station is forecast to be Umeå East, since it is within walking distance of Umeå University and the University Hospital. Umeå Central Station was closed in 2010-2011 for rebuilding.

Ådalen Line

The Bothnia Line ends near the Höga Kusten Airport at the existing Ådalen Line, which runs Långsele–Kramfors–Härnösand–Sundsvall. This railway was built from 1890–1925, and is rather curvy and in poor condition. The improvements included new rails, new catenary, a new signalling system (ERTMS) and better and fewer road crossings. The reason for keeping most of the existing route is that the advantage of building a new railway is smaller when there already is a railway, but the costs for a new railway would be the same as if there was no railway, which is the case along the Bothnia Line. The total improvement cost for the Ådalen Line was 6 billion SEK.

Old main line
The Main Line Through Upper Norrland from Bräcke to Boden was built between 1880–1895. The Bothnia Line replaced all passenger traffic on the Main Line Through Upper Norrland between Bräcke and Vännäs, ending service to the stations at Långsele and Mellansel. The line remains in use by freight traffic and occasional diversions of passenger trains during engineering works.

North Bothnia Line

The North Bothnia Line (Norrbotniabanan) is a planned extension of the Bothnia Line north of Umeå to Luleå. The preliminary decision to build the line as far as Skellefteå has been made. Construction began in 2020 on the first section of the line from Västerslätt in Umeå to Sävar.

Both the North Bothnia Line and the Bothnia Line will have the advantage of immediately reducing the cost of the frequent and heavy freight traffic when finished. They will provide large travel time reductions for passengers compared to buses; for example, travel time between Umeå and Luleå may be reduced by at least 1.5 hours.

References

External links

Official website

 
Railway lines in Sweden
High-speed railway lines in Sweden
Railway lines opened in 2010
2010 establishments in Sweden